Grammer is a surname. Notable people with the surname include:

Andy Grammer, American singer and songwriter
Billy Grammer, American singer
Camille Grammer, American television personality
Elijah S. Grammer, American businessman and politician
Greer Grammer, American actress
Kelsey Grammer, American actor
Mabel Grammer, American journalist
Red Grammer, American singer and songwriter
Robin Grammer Jr., American politician
Spencer Grammer, American actress
Tracy Grammer, American folk singer

See also
Grammer (disambiguation)